Holcombe is a census-designated place located in Chippewa County, Wisconsin, United States.

Description

Holcombe is located on the Chippewa River north-northeast of Cornell, in the town of Lake Holcombe. Holcombe has a post office with ZIP code 54745. As of the 2010 census, its population was 267.

History
Holcombe was founded in 1902. It was named for an acquaintance of a railroad official. A post office has been in operation in Holcombe since 1902.

References

Census-designated places in Chippewa County, Wisconsin
Census-designated places in Wisconsin